Niujiaotuo  is an interchange station between Line 2 and Line 3 of Chongqing Rail Transit in Chongqing Municipality, China, which opened in 2005. It is located in Yuzhong District.

Station structure

Line 2

Line 3

References

Yuzhong District
Railway stations in Chongqing
Railway stations in China opened in 2004
Chongqing Rail Transit stations